Ebonshire - Volume 4 is the 24th album released by Nox Arcana. It is the fourth in a series of winter holiday EPs inspired by Nox Arcana's holiday music trilogy: Winter's Knight (2005), Winter's Eve (2009), and Winter's Majesty (2012), which are each set in a fantasy realm called Ebonshire.

Track listing
 Running With Wolves — 3:01
 The Dark Before The Dawn — 4:18
 Evening Snowfall — 3:53

References

External links 
 

Nox Arcana albums
2016 Christmas albums
Christmas EPs
Christmas albums by American artists
New-age Christmas albums